Dirk Stegmann (born 8 March 1983) is a former South African tennis player.

Stegmann has a career high ATP singles ranking of 341 achieved on 28 October 2002. He also has a career high ATP doubles ranking of 170 achieved on 21 October 2002.

Stegmann has 1 ATP Challenger Tour title at the 2002 Fergana Challenger.

References

External links

1983 births
Living people
South African male tennis players